Megadolomedes is a genus of spider in the family Pisauridae. The genus contains only one species, Megadolomedes australianus, commonly known as the giant water spider. It is one of Australia's largest spiders, with a legspan of up to 18 cm. Found near creeks and ponds, it is capable of running on water. Food includes small fish, tadpoles and aquatic insects. Air is trapped on body and leg hair, allowing them to stay underwater for long periods of time.

German naturalist Ludwig Carl Christian Koch described the giant water spider as Dolomedes australianus in 1865, from a specimen collected in Wollongong.

References

Pisauridae
Spiders of Australia
Monotypic Araneomorphae genera